= Tubercular =

Tubercular may refer to:

- tubercle
- tuberculosis
